Morgan Teressa Janai Stuart (born February 8, 1989) is an American-Filipino softball coach and former infielder. She played college softball at Washington and was on the 2009 Women's College World Series championship team. She also played on the Philippines women's national softball team.

Early life and education
Born in Long Beach, California, Stuart grew up in Riverside and graduated with a 4.0 GPA from Riverside Polytechnic High School.

At the University of Washington, Stuart started regularly at both shortstop and third base for the Washington Huskies softball team from 2008 to 2011. Stuart earned honorable mention All-Pac-10 honors three times, in 2008, 2009, and 2011. In 2009, the year when Washington won the Women's College World Series, Stuart started all 63 games, with 36 at third base and 27 at shortstop and a team-leading 37 RBI. She earned WCWS All-Tournament honors for a .476 batting average in the series.

As a senior in 2011, Stuart started all 53 games at third base, hitting .271 with 29 RBI and seven homers.

Coaching career
In 2013, Stuart was an assistant coach at UC Riverside and played professional softball in Switzerland. In 2014, Stuart was an assistant coach at Loyola Marymount.

After leaving Loyola Marymount, Stuart co-founded with Amanda Scarborough among others to create The Packaged Deal, a series of softball clinics.

International career
Eligible due to being half-Filipino, Stuart played on the Philippines women's national softball team, also known as the "Blu Girls", in the 2014 Asian Games and 2014 World Cup of Softball.

References

External links

1989 births
Living people
American sportspeople of Filipino descent
Filipino softball players
Washington Huskies softball players
Softball players at the 2014 Asian Games
Loyola Marymount Lions softball coaches
UC Riverside Highlanders softball coaches
Sportspeople from Long Beach, California
Sportspeople from Riverside, California
Softball players from California
Filipino sportswomen
American softball coaches
Asian Games competitors for the Philippines
American expatriate sportspeople in Switzerland